Palm River is an unincorporated community located in Hillsborough County, Florida, United States. It shares its name with the Palm River, a waterway sided with trail. Palm River boundaries include McKay Bay to the west, Tampa city limits to the north, the Clair Mel to the east, and Progress Village to the south.

Situation
The community is combined with Clair Mel to form the census-designated place of Palm River-Clair Mel, thus no data was available separately. The community is served by a 33619 ZIP Code.

Geography
Palm River is located at 27.942 North, 82.397 West, or approximately four miles east-southeast of Tampa. The elevation of the community is 10 feet above sea level.

References

External links
 Community of Palm River information page

Unincorporated communities in Hillsborough County, Florida
Unincorporated communities in Florida
Populated places on Tampa Bay